Ed Krol (born August 21, 1951) is the former network manager at the National Center for Supercomputing Applications and the former assistant director of Campus Information Technologies and Educational Services (CITES) at the University of Illinois at Urbana–Champaign. He is also the author of The Hitchhiker's Guide to the Internet and The Whole Internet (User's Guide and Catalog).

Background
Krol was born on August 21, 1951, and grew up in Chicago, Illinois. He received his B.A. from the University of Illinois and spent his entire career there.

Career
In 1985, Krol began working at the National Center for Supercomputing Applications (NCSA). He was the network manager for the NCSA when the contract was received to establish the NSFNet, and led the team in the network development. He helped develop the Frequently Asked Questions format when he published the popular user's guide Hitchhiker's Guide to the Internet in 1987, which was funded by the National Science Foundation. In 1989, he became the assistant director for Network Information Services, Computing, and Communications Service Office at the University of Illinois.

In 1992, Krol published The Whole Internet User's Guide and Catalog, which was noted by the New York Public Library as one of its Books of the Century in 1995.  The book was translated into over ten languages and sold over a million copies. This aided the worldwide acceptance and spread of the Internet. In 1999, Krol and Kiersten Conner-Sax published a sequel titled The Whole Internet User's Guide: The Next Generation.

In 2002 Krol retired from the University of Illinois after working there for 29 years.

Works

Awards
 Inducted into the Internet Hall of Fame 2017

See also
 History of the Internet

References

External links
 

American technology writers
Internet pioneers
1951 births
Living people
O'Reilly writers
Grainger College of Engineering alumni